Club Sportif de Korba, often referred to as CS Korba is a football club from Korba, Tunisia. Founded in 1960, the team plays in green and yellow colors. Their ground is the Municipal Stadium of Korba, which has a capacity of 6,000.

Honours
Tunisian League 2: 1
1981/82

References
Club Profil @ WFA

External links
  official site www.cskorba.fr.gd

Association football clubs established in 1960
Football clubs in Tunisia
1960 establishments in Tunisia
Sports clubs in Tunisia